U.S. Route 12 or U.S. Highway 12 (US 12) is an east–west United States Numbered Highway, running from Aberdeen, Washington, to Detroit, Michigan, for almost . The highway has mostly been superseded by Interstate 90 (I-90) and I-94, but, unlike most U.S. Highways that have been superseded by an Interstate, US 12 remains as an important link for local and regional destinations. The highway's western terminus in Aberdeen is at an intersection with US 101, while the highway's eastern terminus in Downtown Detroit is at the corner of Michigan and Cass avenues, near Campus Martius Park.

Route description

|-
|WA
|
|-
|ID
|
|-
|MT
|
|-
|ND
|
|-
|SD
|
|-
|MN
|
|-
|WI
|
|-
|IL
|
|-
|IN
|
|-
|MI
|
|-
|Total
|
|}

Washington

The western terminus of US 12 is located in Aberdeen. In the 1960s, a portion of US 12 was moved north to the town of Morton, when Mossyrock Dam was built and flooded the towns of Kosmos and Riffe, along the Cowlitz River in Lewis County. A large portion of old, two-lane US 12 was replaced by I-82 and I-182 in the 1980s, between Yakima and the Tri-Cities, though the freeways are still cosigned with the US 12 designation. The old two-lane highway now bears the name Wine Country Road. The highway loosely follows the eastbound leg of the Lewis and Clark Expedition, between Wallula and Clarkston, thus being marked as part of the Lewis and Clark National Historic Trail. The east end of the highway in the state is at Clarkston, where the highway crosses the Snake River into Idaho at Lewiston, Idaho.

The Washington section of US 12, other than a concurrency with I-5, is defined at Washington Revised Code § 47.17.055.

Idaho

US 12 enters the state at Lewiston, crossing the Snake River from Clarkston, Washington. It reduces to a two-lane undivided highway with signs that read "winding road next " and goes on to Orofino, continuing up the middle fork of that river to Lowell, the junction of the Lochsa and Selway rivers. It continues up the Lochsa and climbs to Lolo Pass at the Montana border. This portion of the highway is also designated as part of the Lewis and Clark National Historic Trail. Most of the highway in Idaho is within Clearwater National Forest. The eastern section of US 12, through remote mountain forest and up to Lolo Pass, was built in the early 1960s, making it the last U.S. Highway constructed. No services are available between Lowell and Powell, about  further east.

Montana

US 12 in Montana has been defined as the Lewis and Clark Highway despite not being the route followed by Lewis and Clark across the state.

US 12's  through Montana's mountains and plains is the greatest distance that US 12 traverses through any state. US 12 continues northeast through Missoula's downtown, eventually meeting I-90. This two-lane section of the trip passes through Avon and Elliston winding through Helena National Forest, over the Continental Divide at MacDonald Pass, and then through Montana's capital city, Helena. US 12 passes over I-15 at which, point it joins US 287 south.

North Dakota

US 12 is a two-lane undivided highway that runs , through Adams, Bowman, and Slope counties in southwest North Dakota. US 12 meets with US 85 in Bowman, and the routes are concurrent for a short distance through the city.

South Dakota
A few miles before reaching Aberdeen, it becomes an at-grade expressway. After the junction with US 281, it goes back to being two lanes for a few miles through Aberdeen and past Aberdeen Regional Airport, before once again becoming a four-lane expressway, until  before Waubay. East of Waubay it becomes again an at-grade expressway until it meets with I-29 near Summit. The speed limit from Aberdeen to I-29 is  except through the communities of Groton, Webster, and Waubay. From there, it heads southeast  until Milbank. The South Dakota section of US 12 is legally defined at South Dakota Codified Laws § 31 April 132.

Minnesota

From the South Dakota–Minnesota state line at Ortonville to Wayzata, US 12 is mostly a rural two-lane highway with a  speed limit, with slower speed limits through towns and a four-lane surface arterial segment through the city of Willmar. From western Wayzata to I-394 in Minnetonka, US 12 is a six-lane freeway. East of I-494, US 12 is invisibly concurrent with I-394 and I-94 through Minneapolis and Saint Paul to the Minnesota–Wisconsin state line at Hudson.

The Minnesota section of US 12 is defined as Routes 149, 26, and 10 in Minnesota Statutes §§ 161.115(80) and 161.114(2).

Wisconsin

US 12 crosses the St. Croix River from Lakeland, Minnesota, into Hudson, running concurrently with I-94 before splitting just east of the city. It mainly follows a similar path to I-94 to the north, before crossing under I-94 into downtown Menomonie before continuing in an easterly direction through Eau Claire. In Fall Creek, US 12 turns southeasterly toward Fairchild, it then runs concurrently with US 10 going east for just  before returning to its course southeast bound. US 12 eventually recrosses I-94 into Black River Falls and then parallels I-94 in a southeastward direction. US 12 also runs through Millston and Kirby. Afterward, it turns directly south to Tomah, where it becomes North Superior Avenue. It alternates between a four- and two-lane road on its way through downtown. US 12 turns south to Baraboo and runs along the western edge of Devil's Lake State Park. In Sauk City, US 12 turns southeast toward Madison and runs along the city's western and southern edges. Here, it becomes a four- to six-lane freeway with US 14 and US 18 known by the locals as "The Beltline". On the southeast side of the city, it crosses I-39/I-90 towards Cambridge. It turns southeast here at runs through Fort Atkinson and Whitewater. In Elkhorn, US 12 becomes a four-lane freeway with a  speed limit. It returns to a two-lane road at the Wisconsin–Illinois state line at Genoa City.

Illinois

In Illinois, US 12 is an arterial surface road that runs from Richmond, southeast to Des Plaines. It then turns due south, continuing through the Chicago metropolitan area, joining with US 45. In Stone Park, US 20 joins US 12/US 45. In Hickory Hills, US 45 continues south, while US 12/US 20 runs due east along 95th Street in the southwest suburbs. From Hickory Hills, US 12/US 20 runs east nearly to the Lake Michigan lakefront and then joins with US 41, as all three routes travel southeast into the state of Indiana.

US 12 is referred to as Rand Road in Chicago's northwest suburbs. Rand is an original name for the area around Des Plaines, the location where the road resumes its westerly direction. South of Des Plaines, US 12 follows Mannheim Road, La Grange Road, and then 95th Street, before merging with US 41 on Ewing and Indianapolis avenues toward the Indiana state line.

Indiana

In Indiana, US 12 is a historically significant route, that winds along the southern coast of Lake Michigan. It runs from an interchange with the Indiana Toll Road, concurrent with US 20 and US 41 in Whiting, to Michiana Shores, at the Michigan state line. A large portion of this segment is known as the Dunes Highway.

Michigan

US 12 is now the only U.S. Highway still serving Downtown Detroit, whose street grid was laid by Augustus B. Woodward, to have a five-way intersection of the roads that would become US 12, US 10, US 16, US 112 and US 25. US 24 still travels through Detroit from Puritan to 8 Mile Road (M-102) on the far west side.

As from the earliest days of its existence, US 12 enters Michigan from Indiana, southwest of New Buffalo, and continues to the old junction of US 12 and US 112 in New Buffalo. It is now assigned between New Buffalo and Detroit (except through Ypsilanti), along what was US 112 until 1962.

On May 4, 2004, the Michigan Department of Transportation (MDOT) designated  of US 12 from New Buffalo to Detroit as a Michigan Heritage Route. The east–west corridor traverses the counties of Berrien, Cass, St. Joseph, Branch, Hillsdale, Lenawee, Washtenaw, and Wayne.

History
Since the highway's creation in 1926, the eastern terminus has always remained within a few blocks of Cadillac Square in downtown Detroit, Michigan.
 1926: Cadillac Square at the convergence with US 10, US 16, US 25, and US 112; US 12 ran along Grand River. The original ending was at Miles City, Montana.
 1939: The American Association of State Highway Officials (AASHO) approved a request to extend US 12 to Yellowstone National Park.
 1956: US 12 was rerouted along the Lodge Freeway (M-10), ending on Jefferson Avenue; the terminus moved four blocks southeast, to the corner of Woodward Avenue (M-1/US 10) and Jefferson Avenue.
 1959: Extended to Missoula, Montana.
 1962: After I-94 was completed across Michigan, it was no longer cosigned with US 12. The US 12 route designation was moved to the former route of US 112, which was decommissioned. US 12 now runs along Michigan Avenue and again ends at Cadillac Square. It was extended to Lewiston, Idaho.
1967: Extended to Aberdeen, Washington, to its present terminus at US 101.
 1970: US 10 was rerouted from Woodward to the Lodge Freeway and Jefferson Avenue. At this time US 12 was apparently extended along Woodward, to again terminate with US 10 at Woodward and Jefferson avenues, though with the designations flipflopped from their 1956 routing.
 2001: The City of Detroit and MDOT, in a series of jurisdictional transfers, moved the terminus back four blocks, to again be at Cadillac Square.
 2005: In another transfer, the US 12 terminus was truncated another four blocks, to end at the Patrick V. McNamara Federal Building, on the corner of Michigan and Cass avenues.

The western terminus was gradually extended westward, until it reached the Pacific Ocean.

Former ferry crossing
In 1925, US 12 in Michigan was originally proposed to run from Detroit to Ludington, across Lake Michigan, via the Pere Marquette Railway car ferry to Manitowoc, Wisconsin, and then continuing into Wisconsin, on what later became US 10, in those two states. The 1974 "Golden Anniversary Celebration" reprint of the 1926 Rand McNally Road Atlas shows US 12 following what later became the route of US 10 through Michigan, from Detroit, through Flint, Saginaw, Midland, and Clare on its way to Ludington.

Wyoming
US 12 originally went into Wyoming before being rerouted into Montana and was proposed to go into Oregon but did not.

Major intersections
Washington
 in Aberdeen
 in Grand Mound. The highways travel concurrently to south-southeast of Napavine.
 in Yakima. I-82/US 12 travel concurrently to south of West Richland. US 12/US 97 travel concurrently to south of Union Gap.
 south of West Richland. I-182/US 12 travel concurrently to Pasco.
 in Pasco. The highways travel concurrently through the city.
 south-southwest of Wallula
Idaho
 in Lewiston. The highways travel concurrently to north-northwest of Lapwai.
Montana
 in Lolo. The highways travel concurrently to Missoula.
 in Missoula. The highways travel concurrently to Garrison.
 in Helena. US 12/US 287 travel concurrently to Townsend.
 south of White Sulphur Springs. The highways travel concurrently to northeast of White Sulphur Springs.
 in Harlowton. The highways travel concurrently to east of Harlowton.
 north of Klein. The highways travel concurrently to Roundup.
 southwest of Forsyth. The highways travel concurrently to east-northeast of Miles City.
North Dakota
 in Bowman. The highways travel concurrently through the city.
South Dakota
 northwest of Selby. The highways travel concurrently to south of Selby.
 in Aberdeen
 northwest of Summit
Minnesota
 in Ortonville
 north of Holloway
 in Willmar
 in Minnetonka. I-394/US 12 travel concurrently to Minneapolis.
 in St. Louis Park.
 in Minneapolis. US 52 travel concurrently to Saint Paul. I-94/US 12 travel concurrently to east of Hudson.
 in Minneapolis. The highways travel concurrently, on separate lanes, through the city.
 in Saint Paul. The highways travel concurrently through the city.
 in Saint Paul. US 10/US 12 travel concurrently through the city.
 in Saint Paul. The highways travel concurrently through the city.
 on the Woodbury–Oakdale city line.
Wisconsin
 in Baldwin. The highways travel concurrently through the city.
 northwest of the Town of Elk Mound
 on the Eau Claire–Altoona city line
 south of Fairchild. The highways travel concurrently to east-southeast of Fairchild.
 in Black River Falls
 in the Town of Tomah
 in Tomah
 in the Town of Lyndon
 on the Lake Delton–Delton town line
 in Middleton.
 in Madison. US 12/US 18 travel concurrently to Cambridge. US 12/US 151 travel concurrently through the city.
 in Madison
 in Elkhorn
Illinois
 in Des Plaines. The highways travel concurrently to west of the Palos Hills–Hickory Hills, Illinois city line.
 in Des Plaines
 west of Rosemont
 on the Melrose Park–Stone Park city line. The highways travel concurrently to East Chicago, Indiana.
 on the Westchester–Hillside–Bellwood city line
 in La Grange
 on the Countryside–Hodgkins city line
 in Willow Springs
 on the Hickory Hills–Bridgeview city line
 in Chicago. The highways travel concurrently to northwest of Whiting, Indiana.
Indiana
 northwest of Whiting
 on the Hammond–Gary city line. The highways travel concurrently into Gary proper.
 in Gary
 in Gary
Michigan
 in New Buffalo Township
 in Bertrand Township
 in White Pigeon
 in Coldwater
 in Woodstock Township
 in Pittsfield Charter Township
 in Ypsilanti Township. The highways travel concurrently through the township, passing through Ypsilanti.
 in Canton
 in Dearborn
 in Dearborn
Cass Avenue in Detroit

See also
 
 U.S. Route 410

References

External links

Endpoints of US highway 12

 
12
12
12
12